Vatakara Lok Sabha constituency is one of the 20 Lok Sabha (parliamentary) constituencies in Kerala state in southern India.

Assembly segments

Vatakara Lok Sabha constituency is composed of the following assembly segments:

Members of Parliament

Election results

General Election 2019

General Election 2014

General Election 2009

See also
 Indian general election, 2014 (Kerala)
 List of Constituencies of the Lok Sabha
 Vatakara

References

External links
Election Commission of India: https://web.archive.org/web/20081218010942/http://www.eci.gov.in/StatisticalReports/ElectionStatistics.asp
2019 Vadakara Constituency Lok Sabha Election Results
Vadakara Lok Sabha Elections Asianet News survey results 2019

Lok Sabha constituencies in Kerala
Politics of Kozhikode district